Kevin Christie (born April 7, 1950) is an American politician in the state of Vermont. He is a member of the Vermont House of Representatives, sitting as a Democrat from the Windsor-4-2 district, having been first elected in 2010.

References

1950 births
Living people
Politicians from Hartford, Connecticut
Eastern Connecticut State University alumni
21st-century American politicians
Democratic Party members of the Vermont House of Representatives